Lepidiota is a genus of beetles belonging to the family Scarabaeidae.

These beetles are large and cylindrical, measuring between 15-38mm in body length. Their body coloration varies and can be black, brown, dark brown or reddish brown, while their body surfaces are often covered in white or yellowish scales that may be sparsely or wholly contained within punctations. The clypeus is emarginate and appears bi-lobed, while the anterior face is shallow and typically smooth and unpunctured medially. The beetles have 10 segmented antennae (rarely 9 segmented) with a 3-segmented lamellate club, although two Australian species have 5 lamellae. The antennal club is not elongated and is usually shorter than the length of the first 7 segments. The beetles have an absent metasternal process and tarsal claws with a median tooth.

Species

Species:

Lepidiota aenigma 
Lepidiota alticalceus 
Lepidiota amitina 
Lepidiota consobrina

References

Scarabaeidae
Scarabaeidae genera